Eilema ratonis is a moth of the  subfamily Arctiinae. It is found in Taiwan.

References

 Natural History Museum Lepidoptera generic names catalog

ratonis